4-O-Methylhonokiol is a neolignan, a type of phenolic compound. It is found in the bark of Magnolia grandiflora and in M. virginiana flowers.

4-O-Methylhonokiol is a CB2 receptor ligand (Ki = 50 nM), showing inverse agonism and partial agonism via different pathways (cAMP and Ca2+), which potently inhibits osteoclastogenesis. 4-O-Methylhonokiol further attenuates memory impairment in presenilin 2 mutant mice through reduction of oxidative damage and inactivation of astrocytes and the ERK pathway. The different neuroprotective effects reported in rodent models may be mediated via CB2 receptors. 4-O-Methylhonokiol activates CB2 receptors and also inhibits the oxygenation of the major endocannabinoid 2-AG via COX-2 in a substrate-selective manner, thus leading to potential synergistic effects at CB receptors. The same study also provided data that 
4-O-methylhonokiol can readily pass the blood–brain barrier.

References 

Lignans
Cannabinoids
GABAA receptor positive allosteric modulators